Pretzelle (stylized in all caps) is a Thai pop girl group formed in 2020, consisting of four members: Inc (Matawee Rattanawijit), Ice (Irawadee Sajjapanichkul), Aumaim (Aunyarin Chaianansopon), and Grace (Apisara Chompusri). Their first mini-album Pretzelle Day was released on May 28, 2020, alongside the music video for the debut single "Never Give Up" (Thai: ไหวมั้ย). On February, 2021, Pretzelle launched their latest special single "First Love" (ต้องชอบแค่ไหน).

History

Formation and debut 
Pretzelle is based on the word 'pretzel'. The meaning behind the newly formed group's name comes from the idea that the infinity shape of the pastry symbolizes happiness and enjoyment. Pretzelle's first performance took place at Thailand's biggest idol group event "Idol Expo #3" which held on January 30, 2020. The group announced their official debut on May 28, 2020, with the mini-album Pretzelle Day and music video for the first single "Never Give Up" (ไหวมั้ย).

The original lineup of Pretzelle included four members: Inc (Mathawee Ratanawijit), Ice (Irawadee Sajjaphanitchkul), Nana (Pattaravarin Su), and Bamee (Kantisha Wibulsamai). The mini-album Pretzelle Day features three tracks: "Never Give Up" (ไหวมั้ย), "I'm Glad" (เมื่อโลกนี้มีเธอ) — the OST for the drama "Leh Game Rak" (เล่ห์เกมรัก), and "Ping Pong Pang Let's Go" — the OST for the Korean KBS1's children show "Teteru".

First lineup change 
On July, 2020, Nana Announced her decision to leave Pretzelle due to personal reasons.

Lodi X Next Idol, reality television appearance 
PRETZELLE joined Workpoint TV's reality television competition 'Lodi X Next Idol' in November 2020. The group eventually entered the top ten, winning against "Cheesy Pie" a Cm Cafe's girl group. Also, a member — Ice, was named the 'Rising Star' of the competition. During the 3 STAND round, Pretzelle performed their cover version of Yinglee Srijumpol's hit "Your Heart For My Number" (ขอใจแลกเบอร์โทร), scoring 232 points, claiming their rightful place on the top 3 stand.

Second lineup change 
On January 12, 2021, Pretzelle announced the official departure of Bamee. According to the statement, due to conflicts between her personal matters and responsibility as a Pretzelle member, the group agreed to terminate Bamee's member status. In January 2021, Pretzelle introduced 2 new members: Aumaim (Aunyarin Chaianansopon) and Grace (Apisara Chompusri).

Fanclub name announcement 
During a live streaming session on February 23, 2021, Pretzelle revealed its official fanclub name "Twist", taken from the twisting of pretzel dough.

Joining T-Pop Stage 
On March 1, 2021, Pretzelle appeared on Workpoint TV's music program "T-POP STAGE", performing their new single "First Love" (ต้องชอบแค่ไหน).  Following the successful performance, "First Love" (ต้องชอบแค่ไหน) entered T-POP STAGE's top chart at number 19 for the second week of February 2021, with total points calculated from fan votes, audio stream count, and YouTube view count for ต้องชอบแค่ไหน (First Love) music video The individual fancams of each member are linked as follows; Inc's fancam, Ice's fancam, Aumaim's fancam, Grace's fancam

Members 
Pretzelle is composed of four members:

 Inc
 Ice
 Aumaim
 Grace

Discography

Pretzelle Day 
The debut Mini-album, released on May 28, 2020.
Track listing

 "ไหวมั้ย (Never Give Up)"
 "เมื่อโลกนี้มีเธอ (I'm Glad)" — OST. "Leh Game Rak" (เล่ห์เกมรัก)
 Ping Pong Pang Let's Go Ost. Teteru
 "ไหวมั้ย (Never Give Up)" (Instrumental)

"First Love" 
Released in February 2021, "First Love" (ต้องชอบแค่ไหน) is a special single that incorporates elements of pop, soul, and jazz. "First Love" is produced by Kankanat 'Benz' Angkanagerathiti, with lyrics written by Piyawat Meekrau (25hours) The audio and music video were launched on February 8, 2021, trending at number 5 on Thailand's Twitter  at 7pm on the same day. On YouTube "First Love" music video's views kept burgeoning, eventually reaching over 5 million views on May 12, 2021. Tracklist
 ต้องชอบแค่ไหน (First Love)
 ต้องชอบแค่ไหน (First Love) (Acoustic Version)
 ต้องชอบแค่ไหน (First Love) (Instrumental)
 ต้องชอบแค่ไหน (First Love) (Acoustic Version) (Instrumental)

"Ready or Not?" 
The 2nd Mini-album, released on May 19, 2022. tracklist
 Ready or Not?
 ก็เธอน่ะน่ารัก (Baby Boy)
 ถ้ามันคือเรื่องจริง (Imagine)
 โอ้มายก๊อด! (Oh My God!)
 อยากเจอเธอแล้ว (Missin' U)

Filmography

Television dramas
Aunyarin Chaianansopon (AumAim)
 20  (/Ch.3) as

Irawadee Sajjaphanitchkul (Ice)
 20  (/Ch.3) as

Mathawee Ratanawijit (Inc)
 20  (/Ch.3) as

Apisara Chompusri (Grace)
 20  (/Ch.3) as

Television series
Aunyarin Chaianansopon (AumAim)
 20  (/Ch.3) as

Irawadee Sajjaphanitchkul (Ice)
 2022 To My Puzzle Pieces (2022) (To My Puzzle Pieces ถึงเธอจิ๊กซอว์ของฉัน) (OKAY D PRODUCTION HOUSE AND DESIGN/Ch.3) as Mild (มายด์)

Mathawee Ratanawijit (Inc)
 20  (/Ch.3) as

Apisara Chompusri (Grace)
 20  (/Ch.3) as

Television sitcom
Aunyarin Chaianansopon (AumAim)
 20  (/Ch.3) as

Irawadee Sajjaphanitchkul (Ice)
 20  (/Ch.3) as

Mathawee Ratanawijit (Inc)
 20  (/Ch.3) as

Apisara Chompusri (Grace)
 20  (/Ch.3) as

MC
 Online 
 20 : On Air YouTube:Pretzelle

References

Thai girl groups
Thai pop music groups
Musical groups established in 2020
Thai YouTubers